OFI Crete Football Club (Club of Fans of Heraklion 1925), is a Greek professional football club based in Heraklion, on the island of Crete. It is a part of the OFI multi sports club. Outside Greece, the club is generally known as OFI Crete FC, however, "Crete" is not actually part of the club's official title. The team competes in the Super League, the top division of the Greek football league system, and hosts home games at the Theodoros Vardinogiannis Stadium in Heraklion, Crete.

OFI is the Cretan club with the most continuous appearances in the Greek first division. It has won one Greek Cup (1986–87) and one Balkans Cup, while they have competed seven times in UEFA competitions.

History

Foundation
The club was founded in the autumn of 1925 by a group of Cretan athletes exercising at the same gym in Heraklion. They registered a new sports club under the name Omilos Filathlon Irakleiou (acronym  OFI) which means "Heraklion Sports Club". The club's official scope was to participate at all kinds of athletic events and exhibitions. During the first OFI's years, the club's founders made up the majority of the members.

The years before World War II (1925–1940)
The years preceding World War II were a very difficult period not only for Crete, but for Greece in general. Thus, it was extremely difficult for OFI to travel and participate in national football tournaments. As a result, OFI was limited to matches around the island of Crete and particularly with other football clubs based in Heraklion. Strangely enough, these local matches were more frequent in comparison to the official ones of former periods. Even though official documentation does not exist, elderly fans of OFI believe that the team played around 400 matches before the Germans finally occupied Crete.

First participation in the National League (1945–1962)
During occupation of Crete in World War II competitions were suspended and players signed up to fight, resulting in the deaths of many players. In the first period after WW2 the football tournament restarted in Greece with a single Championship, the "First Division", in which only major football clubs from Athens and Thessaloniki participated, including a few teams which qualified through preliminary rounds. However, it was almost impossible for a team coming from the province to take part in it.

This situation arose because the Hellenic Football Federation structured a system in which football teams from around the country had to play many preliminary rounds before proceeding to the national championship. As a result, even though OFI was the top football team in Crete, they could not qualify to the national tournament.

After 1956, the system in Greece changed slightly. Advantages were that in some seasons the preliminary rounds were organized in groups of a few teams, where the champions of each group were promoted directly to the championship of the same season's First Division. One of those seasons was in 1957–58. OFI played preliminary games in a group of 4 teams, where they finished in first place. Thus, OFI, for the first time in its history, participated in the Greek National Championship. However, the team could not stand the frequent trips around Greece and finished in last position. Up to 1962, when the official 2nd Division Championship was organized, OFI tried again many times, but unsuccessfully, to take part in the competition of the 1st Division again.

Attempts in the 2nd League (1962–1968)

In 1962–63 the official Greek 2nd division league was set up for first time. OFI was one of the teams that participated in the league and completed the season in 9th position. In 1963–64 and 1964–65, OFI finished in 3rd and 5th position respectively.

In 1965–66, OFI were the champions of the 2nd Division of Greek football and only one step away from promotion to the official 1st National Division of Greek football.
Yet, the Hellenic Football Federation decided that even the champions of the 2nd Division had to play preliminary games in order to be promoted.

OFI lost in the play-off matches and remained in the 2nd Division. In 1966–67 the disappointment was huge, even though OFI ended in 3rd position. Everyone on the island of Crete was feeling that the moment where they could see the pride of their island in the top league was very close.
In 1967–68, OFI finished in 2nd position and went into play-off games with the bottom team of the 1st division. The final match of the play-offs was to take place in the city of Chania, on 26 June 1968. OFI, with the help of 10,000 Cretans thrashed the team from the 1st division with a 3–0 win and made the dreams of thousands of supporters come true. OFI was an official member of the 1st National Division.

Debut in the 1st League (1968–1971)
OFI's debut in the national 1st division was very difficult. "Omilos" ended the first round in 15th position. It was a very difficult task to remain in the league. However, in the 2nd round the Cretans played magnificently and finally finished in 12th place. In the next season OFI had already gained the experience of playing in the top league of Greek football. The "Snakes" finished in 13th place, but the strange thing was that OFI remained unbeaten in almost all of their home games in Heraklion. Only two teams managed to survive and leave Crete with an away win. Thus, even if OFI was not a feared opponent, all the other teams were anxious when taking the trip to the island of Crete.

1970–71 was the worst season the team from Heraklion ever had in the 1st Division. OFI ended in 17th position and was relegated for the last time in their history to the 2nd division. The whole season was a tragedy for the Cretans. OFI had to meet "old friends" from the 2nd division again and start battling again in order to be promoted for a second time.

Back to the 2nd League (1971–1976)
OFI had been relegated again, but this time the 2nd division had changed entirely. After all, the championship had been more officially organized and opponents were tougher than before.

OFI spent another 5 seasons in the 2nd division, from 1971–72 to 1975–76. During the first season, the team was continually in 1st place.

However, at the end of the season, OFI's good performances deteriorated and they finally finished 4th. In 1972–73 the management decided on a complete overhaul of the squad. In these circumstances, the 13th position OFI achieved was predictable, yet a new era of the stars of OFI had just begun. In the next season OFI finished 6th and in 1974–75 they finished 5th. In the next season the league was divided again into two groups, each of 20 teams. The champions of each group would be promoted directly to the First National Division. OFI couldn't afford to miss this chance.
Everything started perfectly for "Omilos" in 1975–76. They finished 1st at the end of the first round with a huge lead over the runners-up and then finished the season as champions. The whole island of Crete was celebrating the promotion of OFI to the 1st division. Up to the present, (2007), OFI have never been relegated again.

Theodoros Vardinogiannis era
During the first 3 seasons of OFI's presence in the 1st Division, the Greek championship still had an amateur status. In 1976–77, even though OFI were rookies, they finished in 6th place and gained the admiration of the whole country. In addition Dimitris Papadopoulos finished the top goal scorer of the League season. The following two seasons OFI finished 8th and 7th respectively, a period in which OFI was never once defeated in Crete. Even the "heavyweights" of the league (Panathinaikos, Olympiacos, AEK & PAOK) struggled to win any points when making the trip to the Genti Koule on island of Crete.

The championship in Greece was professionalized in the 1979–80 season and in the middle of that term the Vardinogiannis group bought the football club of OFI with Theodoros Vardinogiannis being the major shareholder. During that season the only team that beat OFI at home in Crete was Panathinaikos. The Athenian team took the victory in Heraklion extremely easily with a score line of 0–3. It was the only loss endured by Cretans on the island that year, after all games had been completed OFI finished in 11th position. The next season Panathinaikos embarked on their first set of experiments on OFI. Young players came from all over the country in order to play for "Omilos". Partly because of this experimentation by their new owners OFI only managed 13th position in the League. The 1981–82 campaign saw OFI finish in 9th place and the following 1982–83 season in 7th. It seemed clear that Theodoros Vardinogiannis wanted OFI to be a stronger team in the championship. He tried to achieve that, not by spending money for good players, but by sending 2nd hand players from his other team Panathinaikos or young players that could possibly be useful to OFI, but primarily, for Panathinaikos in the future when the time was right. Thus, in 1983–84, three goalkeepers, one midfielder and one defender came from the Athenian team to Crete. 

The continuing experimentation caused OFI to be disappointed yet again. OFI finished in 8th place, exactly the same position they finished next season too. Although OFI's results were not wonderful, this group of fresh players had gained experience and started to play like a team. The one thing that was missing was a good coach, who could get the best out of each player. This man arrived the following season.

Gerards' years (1985–2000)

In 1985, OFI appointed Dutch Eugène Gerards as the head coach, who remained for a legendary 15 years. This is still the record tenure for a coach in the Greek League, and will be a feat that lives long in the memory of Cretans. Gerards' first 3 years at the helm in Crete were nothing short of amazing. In 1985–86, OFI finished 2nd in the league and only missed out on becoming champions by 5 points. Gerards continued his revolution with a 3rd-place finish in 1986–87 and 4th place in 1987–88. As Gerards' OFI continued to achieve high finishes in the Greek Championship the team from Crete did something wonderful 21 June 1987. In the Olympic Stadium in Athens they defeated Iraklis 3–1 on penalties winning the Greek Cup. The game had finished 1–1 after regular and extra time. With string league position and victorious in the Cup OFI was at that time one of the major players in Greek football.
The 1987–88 season was special for Cretans for another reason too – it was the first time in league history that OFI finished in a higher position than Panathinaikos, beating them 2–1 in Heraklion on the way, with a goal in last minute from Stefanos Vavoulas.
This golden era also saw OFI participate in European competition – UEFA Cup 1986 and UEFA Cup Winners' Cup 1987.

On 7 June 1989, OFI won the Balkans Cup by beating Radnički Niš 3–1 in Serres.

In the following seasons (1989–90, 1990–91, 1991–92) OFI wasn't as successful. OFI finished 6th, 7th and 6th respectively, missing UEFA Cup participation by a few points. On 27 May 1990, OFI made the biggest overthrow in Greek football, as the club losing to 50' with 4–0 from Olympiacos in Karaiskakis Stadium, ending with 4–5. In June 1990, OFI played once again in the final of the Greek Cup, this time against Olympiacos. The game took place in Olympiacos' home stadium and OFI lost 4–2.

In June 1991, OFI played in the final of the Pre-Mediterranean Cup, against AEK Athens. The game took place in Georgios Kamaras Stadium and OFI lost 1–0.

During the last of those three seasons, OFI brought a young Argentinian star to Crete – Victor Hugo Delgado. However, there was little time for Cretans to enjoy the benefits of his talent as he was soon transferred to Panathinaikos.

In season 1992–93, OFI was in great form once again. OFI finished 4th in the Championship and qualified for the following season's UEFA Cup tournament. The season's great star for OFI was Nikos Nioplias. At the end of the previous season the Vardinogiannis family decided that he might become useful to Panathinaikos, so he became the 3rd player to move to Athens from OFI. Without the team's great star, OFI only managed a 7th-place finish in the 1993–94 Championship. But despite those facts the name of OFI was heard loud and clear all around Europe. That season OFI achieved the unthinkable – they eliminated Slavia Prague in the 1st round of the UEFA Cup and Atlético Madrid in the 2nd round (both 2–1 on aggregate). Nobody in Europe could believe that an unknown quantity like OFI could ever knock out of Europe such illustrious opposition. The famous cup run came to an end when OFI was eliminated in the 3rd round by Portuguese club Boavista (round of 16). Despite the disappointment there was pride for Cretans to be taken in that their team was the most successful Greek team in European competition that season. 
In 1994–95, Panathinaikos were in dire need of a striker, and OFI had 2 top rated strikers from the previous season, Nikos Machlas and Alexis Alexoudis. Even though Panathinaikos wanted Machlas, he himself refused to go to Athens, and as a result, Panathinaikos grabbed Alexoudis. OFI ended in the 9th position this year. In the next season, Eugène Gerards tried to build a new team with young players. Yet the Dutchman had lost 2 great players to Panathinaikos and Nikos Machlas was transferred to Vitesse Arnhem. OFI finished 5th and missed qualification for the UEFA Cup in the last game of the season.

1996–97 was an amazing season for "Omilos". With the participation of Nikos Nioplias (Panathinaikos did not need him anymore, so he was transferred back to OFI), OFI was in 2nd place before the winter break and four of their players were part of the Greece National Team.
On the last day of the transfer period, Panathinaikos grabbed Kostas Konstantinidis, the best defender of OFI's squad. Finally OFI finished 3rd in the championship by humiliating Panathinaikos one week before the end and leaving the team from Athens in 5th place, outside the positions leading to UEFA competitions. The whole island of Crete was again celebrating the great performance of OFI.

In the next two seasons, OFI finished in 7th and 8th position respectively, suffering constant humiliations by Panathinaikos in matches between the two, as revenge for what happened in May 1997. In addition to that, Kostas Kiassos, a great OFI midfielder, was the next 'victim' and was transferred to Panathinaikos. Nevertheless, OFI resumed their successful UEFA Cup campaigns. The pride of Crete eliminated Icelandic team KR Reykjavik in the second qualifying round (3–1 on aggregate) and Hungarian team Ferencváros in the 1st round proper (4–2 on aggregate, with an unforgettable 3–0 victory in Crete). OFI's European dream was ended by AJ Auxerre in the 2nd round of the UEFA Cup.

In the year 2000 and after 15 successful years, Eugène Gerards announced his retirement from OFI's bench as the team finished 4th in the championship. It was the last time that OFI gained a position that lead to European competitions, and the last season that OFI was considered one of the top teams in Greece.

New era (2000–2009)
The new century found OFI unstable and close to relegation almost every year. While Nioplias and Machlas retired, the team partly suffered from a series of bad rosters and managers. In 2001, OFI really struggled to remain to the 1st League. The next two years, OFI managed to play a little better, thus avoiding low positions easier. But then the dark years came: OFI avoided relegation every year, for one or two points difference.

President Fanouris Vatsinas appointed German Reiner Maurer as a coach in the summer of 2006. Maurer had the team playing greater football, even competing for a European place since the Gerards era. In the 2007 summer, OFI played in the Intertoto cup, but under-performed. The 2007–08 season found the club fighting to avoid relegation once again, and Maurer was sacked. Giorgos Paraschos was brought as a temporary manager, and he was eventually replaced by Czech, František Straka before the start of the new season.

In 2009, OFI suffered from the bad presidency of Fanouris Vatsinas, who was asked by the fans to leave the club. Furthermore, former player Machlas offered a great amount of money in order to purchase the team. OFI started with awful results, Straka was dismissed and Ioannis Matzourakis came to fill his position. During the 2008–09 season, OFI struggled to remain to the Greek Super League, but failed and is in fact relegated to the second division after finishing 16th.

Since relegation OFI has gone into 'meltdown'.
Once the season had ended the majority of the club's senior players filed claims against club's president Fanouris Vatsinas for hundreds of thousands of euros in unpaid wages. As the non-payment of wages was also a breach of contract many of them also freed themselves from their professional contracts with the club and sought new teams for the forthcoming season.

Meltdown and restart (2009−2018) 
It took OFI two years to eventually return to the Super League, under a new administration led by former OFI scoring legend Nikos Machlas. Despite managing an impressive 6th-place finish in the 2013−14 season, severe financial debts around the €12 million range would not allow the club to relive its past glory days in top-flight. OFI quickly fell behind in the league Table during the 2014–15 season. On 21 March 2015, OFI withdrew from professional competitions, as the administration failed to meet the club's pressing financial obligations. In a symbolic gesture, the 15 players who still comprised the club's roster walked on the pitch of the Theodoros Vardinogiannis Stadium on that day (before match-day 29) and waived OFI's fans farewell. After 47 consecutive years in professional competitions, OFI was relegated to amateur status.

As a result, the professional football department merged with its parent sports club, which opened up winding-up proceedings and appointed liquidators for the bankrupt Football Club, a process that would allow a new football department of OFI to compete in the amateur Gamma Ethniki (the third tier of the Greek football league system under new leadership, free of the financial obligations of the previous administration. OFI, therefore played in the third division for the first time in its history during the 2015−16 season, managing instant promotion after winning the Division title. After spending two seasons in the Football League, OFI eventually achieved a return to the Super League as 2017−18 Second Division champions, alongside fellow historic top-tier regulars Aris Thessaloniki.

The Michael Bousis era 
On 4 October 2018, Professional Sports Committee of Greece announced that Michael Bousis became the new major shareholder of OFI and in a few days (on 10 October) he took over the leadership of the administration during a press conference in Heraklion.

On 18 April 2019, the Professional Sports Committee of Greece announced that team Vice President C' Angelo P. Palivos, his brother Gregory Palivos and their mother Vassiliki Tyrvolis Palivos, secured ownership and control of 36.4% of the team's shares. The brothers both served on the teams Board of Directors on behalf of the Palivos family of Las Vegas, Nevada & Chicago, Illinois.

On 22 June 2020, Michael Bousis bought out the shares of the Palivos family and became again the majority owner of OFI Crete FC. On the same day, Angelo and Gregory Palivos resigned from their board seats.

On 17 May 2021, Michael Bousis announced that Minas Lysandrou, is the new CEO of the club. Lysandrou served as AEK Athens F.C CEO up until 31 March 2021.

Crest and colours

Crest 
OFI's traditional crest has been used since the club's foundation in 1925 (with several variations throughout the years). It featured a white shield with a black outline, and a diagonal black ribbon containing the club's acronym "ΟΦΗ" in white Greek letters, read from the bottom left to the top right of the crest. In 2016, as part of the club's re-entry into professional competitions after its dissolution the year before, the club's foundation date «1925» was added to the crest, while the outline was significantly thickened, so as to constitute a substantial visual change from the logo of the bankrupt, liquidated forerunner Club.

As of August 2020, the club's new administration issued a new crest, which incorporates the Greek letters "ΟΦΗ" in the centre of a circle, thus forming the badge of the club. According to the club's press release for the unveiling of the club's new logo, the departure from the previously used shield, and use of the circle expresses stability and balance, while the concentric circle design being used as a metaphor for teamwork, focus and dynamism. Visually, the crest' design was inspired by the lines of the football field as seen from above, with the letters O and H corresponding to the two boxes, and the letter Φ representing for the center of the pitch.

Colours 
The colours that OFI used were black and white, because none of the existing sports clubs had the same colour combination in Crete.

Sponsorships:
Great Shirt Sponsor: OPAP
Official Sport Clothing Manufacturer: Puma
Golden Sponsor: AVIS

Stadium

OFI's stadium is Theodoros Vardinogiannis Stadium, a stadium in Heraklion, Crete, Greece. It was built in 1951 (not at its present state) as the home stadium of OFI. The stadium is commonly known by its nickname, Yedi Kule ("Seven Towers" in Turkish). The historic ground of OFI was constructed in 1951 and after the death of the historic leader of the club it was named "Theodoros Vardinoyannis". The opening of the stadium took place on 11 November 1951 with the football game of OFI Crete with the team of Α.Σ.Δ.Α.Ν. (English: A.S.D.A.N.) (something like the current national team) and the result was a defeat for OFI, 4–1, a result that had a little meaning compared with the benefits that the Cretan club had won. At last, the largest Cretan club acquired its own "home", that would roof all the faithful of the new football ideals developed in Iraklion, Crete. The stadium was built on the ruins of a Christian and a Jewish cemetery and that in the area where the pitch is located, there were two big holes, remaining structures of German army guns from the World War II occupation.
The highest attendance recorded at Yedi Kule is 12,391 for OFI's match against Olympiacos on 25 September 1988. OFI won the game 2–1.

Supporters
OFI has a big fan base in Crete. Most popular organized fan clubs are the "Snakes 4 Heraklion club" and "S.F Cretans 4 T. Papadopoulos".

OFI fans have good relations with the fans of PAOK, a friendship that started in October 1987 when OFI faced Atalanta for 1987–88 Cup Winners' Cup at Toumba Stadium and numerous PAOK fans supported the Cretans.

Rivalries

Rivalry with Ergotelis

OFI has enjoyed a fierce rivalry with other local Super League side, Ergotelis. The first ever game between Ergotelis and OFI, a friendly match in 1929, ended after 35 minutes. Ergotelis were ahead by one goal, when the game had to be abandoned after violence between the players broke out. Under the Greek military junta of 1967–1974, a legislation determined that every regional Greek city should be represented by one football team. At that time, both OFI and Ergotelis used to play in the Second National division (Football League). Αt the end of the 1966–67 season, Ergotelis finished 8th, while OFI finished in a higher position, leading to Ergotelis' relegation. The legislation also allowed the remaining teams in the second division to sign players of the relegated ones, and thus five Ergotelis players were transferred to OFI. In the years to come Ergotelis languished in the lower leagues. This led to various controversies, especially since Ergotelis' come back, at the early 2000s. This rivalry has shown signs of diminishing over the years, with OFI fans attending newly promoted Ergotelis' games in the Super League during the club's first season in the competition, and Ergotelis loaning their longtime scoring legend Patrick Ogunsoto to a financially weakened Beta Ethniki side OFI for no fee, as an attempt to assist the latter in their struggle to return to the Super League.

Honours

Domestic
Super League
Runners-up (1): 1985–86
Greek Cup
 Winners (1): 1986–87
Runners-up (1): 1989–90
Pre-Mediterranean Cup
Runners-up (1): 1990–91
Greek Super Cup
Runners-up (1): 1987
Football League
 Winners (3): 1965–66, 1975–76, 2017–18
Gamma Ethniki (3rd National Division)
 Winners (1): 2015–16

European Competitions
Balkans Cup
 Winners (1): 1989

Regional
Heraklion FCA Championship (Tiers 4−7)
Winners (18) (record): 1927−28, 1928−29, 1930−31, 1931−32, 1932−33, 1934−35, 1947−48, 1948−49, 1951−52, 1953−54, 1954−55, 1955−56, 1956−57, 1957−58, 1958−59, 1959−60, 1960−61, 1961−62

Seasons in the Super League era 

Best position in bold.

Key: FR = First Round, 3R = Third Round, 4R = Fourth Round, 5R = Fifth Round, GS = Group Stage, R16 = Round of 16, QF = Quarter-finals, SF = Semi-finals.

Players

Current squad

Out on loan

Personnel

Ownership and current staff

 

|}

Coaching staff

|}

Medical staff

|}

European record

Managerial history

 Stratos (1946)
 Kostas Zogas (1958)
 Mantalopoulos (1959)
 Vaggelis Helmis (1965–66)
 Petritsis (1967–68)
 Kostas Zogas (1967–68)
 Domagoj Kapetanović (1968–71)
 Giorgos Stratakis (1970–71)
 Thanasis Soulis (1971–72)
 Giorgos Stratakis (1971–72)
 Takis Papartheniou (1972–73)
 Kostas Karapatis &  Manolis Tzanis (1973–74)
 Thanasis Zafeiropoulos (1975–76)
 Nikos Alefantos (1976–77)
 Antonis Georgiadis (1978–30 June 1980)
 Les Shannon (1979–80)
 Nikos Alefantos (1981–82)
 Giorgos Stratakis (1981–82)
 Les Shannon (1982–84)
 Manolis Tzanis &  Aris Vasileiou (1984)
 Lakis Petropoulos (1984–85)
 Giannis Parasidis (1984–85)
 Petr Packert (1984–85)
 Mike Bailey (1984–85)
 Eugène Gerards (23 June 1985 – 20 Nov 2000)
 Aris Vasileiou (2000)
 Giannis Samaras (2000–02)
 Zdeněk Ščasný (1 July 2002 – 15 Nov 2003)
 Giorgos Foiros (26 Nov 2003 – 30 June 2004)
 Giannis Chatzinikolaou (1 July 2004 – 30 June 2005)
 Vangelis Vlachos (1 July 2005 – 13 Feb 2006)
 Myron Sifakis (14 Feb 2006 – 30 June 2006)
 Reiner Maurer (1 July 2006 – 12 Nov 2007)
 Giorgos Paraschos (16 Nov 2007 – 30 June 2008)
 František Straka (1 July 2008 – 11 Oct 2008)
 Ioannis Matzourakis (12 Oct 2008 – 15 May 2009)
 Giorgos Paraschos (2009)
 Nicos Papavasiliou &  Myron Sifakis (1 July 2009 – 2 Nov 2009)
 Nikos Goulis (5 Nov 2009 – 30 June 2010)
 Giannis Chatzinikolaou (1 July 2010 – 28 Sept 2010)
 Nikos Anastopoulos (28 Sept 2010 – 29 Dec 2012)
 Giannis Petrakis (2 Jan 2013 – 10 May 2013)
 Pavlos Dermitzakis (16 May 2013 – 7 Oct 2013)
 Ricardo Sá Pinto (18 Oct 2013 – 25 May 2014)
 Gennaro Gattuso (5 June 2014 – 30 Dec 2014)
 Nikos Anastopoulos (1 Jan 2015 – 21 Mar 2015)
 Murat Seropian (1 July 2015 – 29 Sept 2015)
 Nikos Goulis (7 Oct 2015 – 7 Jan 2016)
 Nikos Nioplias (21 Jan 2016 – 21 Jan 2017)
 Nikos Papadopoulos (24 Jan 2017 – 21 Jan 2019)
 Jaime Vera (25 Jan 2019 – 29 June 2019)
 Georgios Simos (12 July 2019 – 6 March 2021)
 Nikos Nioplias (6 March 2021 – 21 October 2022)
 Valdas Dambrauskas (25 October 2022 – present)

Records and statistics

Most appearances and top scorers

See also
O.F.I. (sports club)

References

External links

Official websites
 
OFI at Super League 
OFI at UEFA
News sites
OFI on gentikoule.gr 
OFI news from Nova Sports
Other
Vardinogianneio Athletic Center

 
Football clubs in Heraklion
Football clubs in Crete
Association football clubs established in 1925
1925 establishments in Greece